Hakkâri, formerly known as Julamerk, is a city and the seat of Hakkâri District in the Hakkâri Province of Turkey. The city is populated by Kurds and had a population of 60,098 in 2022.

It is located about 40 kilometres from the Iraq–Turkey border, but the distance to the nearest Iraqi border crossing (Ibrahim Khalil Border Crossing) by road is about 270 km.

Etymology
Ibn Khallikan wrote in the 13th century that the word Hakkari meant 'belonging to Hakkar', a Kurdish tribe.

Neighborhoods 
The city is divided into the neighborhoods of Bağlar, Berçelan, Biçer, Bulak, Dağgöl, Gazi, Halife Derviş, Karşıyaka, Keklikpınar, Kıran, Medrese, Merzan, Pehlivan, Sümbül and Yeni.

History

Hubushkia

Hubushkia was an Iron Age kingdom located between the Urartian and Assyrian sphere of influence. The exact location of Hubushkia is unknown, but scholars suggests that the kingdom of Hubushkia was centred on the headwaters of the Great Zap River, in what is now Hakkâri Province in Eastern Anatolia, Turkey.

Hakkari kurgan stelae
Thirteen Kurgan stelae, never before seen in Anatolia or the Near East, were found in 1998 in their original location at the centre of Hakkari. The stelae were carved on upright flagstone-like slabs measuring between 0.7 m to 3.10 m in height. The stones contain only one cut surface, upon which human figures are chiseled. The theme of each stele reveals the foreview of an upper human body. The legs are not represented. Eleven of the stelae depict naked warriors with daggers, spears, and axes—masculine symbols of war. They always hold a drinking vessel made of skin in both hands. Two stelae contain female figures without arms. The stelae may have been carved by different craftsmen using different techniques. Stylistic differences shift from bas relief to a more systematic linearity. The earliest stelae are in the style of bas relief while the latest ones are in a linear style. They were made during a period from the fifteenth century BC to the eleventh century BC in Hakkari. Stelae with this type of relief are not common in the ancient Near East however there are many close parallels between these and those produced by a variety of peoples from the Eurasian steppes between the third millennium BC and the eleventh century AD.

Sport 
The women's football club Hakkarigücü Spor was promoted to the Women's First League to take part in the 2018–19 season after finishing the 2017–18 Second League season as runners-up.

Notable people 

 Evdilsemedê Babek (972–1019), Kurdish poet
 Ali Hariri (1009–1079/80), Kurdish poet
 Izz al-Din Shir (1384–1453) Famous founder of the Emirate of Hakkâri
 Çelik Gülersoy (1930–2006), Turkish lawyer of Kurdish descent
 Hacı Karay (1950–1994), Kurdish Human rights Activist
 Savaş Buldan (1961–1994), Kurdish Businessperson
 Yılmaz Erdoğan (born 1967), film actor, activist, poet
 Pervin Buldan (born 1967), Turkish politician of Kurdish origin
 Abdullah Zeydan (born 1972), Kurdish politician

Population 
Population history of the municipality from 2000 to 2022:

Climate
Hakkâri has a hot-summer, Mediterranean-influenced humid continental climate (Köppen climate classification: Dsa, Trewartha climate classification: Dca). The winters are cold and snowy with an average of −5 °C (23 °F), while summers are hot and dry. The lowest recorded temperature was −22.7 °C (−8.86 °F) on 7 February 1997. The summer are hot and dry with an average of 25 °C (76 °F). The highest recorded temperature was 37 °C (98.6 °F) on 2 August 1991.

See also
1930 Hakkari earthquake
2010 Hakkâri bus attack
2011 Hakkâri attack
Emirate of Hakkâri
Massacres of Badr Khan
Hakkari (historical region)

References

External links

History of Hakkari (in Turkish)
Assyrians in Hakkari

 
Cities in Turkey
Populated places in Hakkâri Province
Turkish Kurdistan
Kurdish settlements in Hakkâri Province